The San Diego Shockwave was a 2007 expansion team from the National Indoor Football League.  They played their home games at the Viejas Arena, which is also home to the San Diego State Aztecs basketball teams.

The Shockwave finished the 2007 season 10–1 in the league and won the NIFL title, but the league itself experienced many difficulties as other teams folded. For 2008, the Shockwave ownership decided not to continue operations in the NIFL.

Some games were broadcast on XEPE, "San Diego 1700 AM."  Chris Ello was the play-by-play announcer.

2007 season results

References

National Indoor Football League teams
American football teams in San Diego
Defunct American football teams in California
American football teams established in 2007
American football teams disestablished in 2007
2007 establishments in California
2007 disestablishments in California